Listed below are the draws for the singles event of Wembley Professional Championships men's tennis tournament held during the professional era from 1934 until 1967.

1934

1935

1937

1939

1949

1950

1951

1952

1953

1956

1957

1958

1959

1960

1961

1962

1963

1964

Preliminary round:
 Robert Haillet def.  Kurt Nielsen 4–6, 6–4, 6–1 
 Luis Ayala def.  Roger Becker 6–2, 6–3

1965

1966

Preliminary round:
 Robert Haillet def.  Roger Becker 6–3, 6–0 
 Kurt Nielsen def.  Jean-Claude Molinari 6–2, 6–2

1967

See also
 U.S. Pro Tennis Championships draws, 1927–1945
 U.S. Pro Tennis Championships draws, 1946–1967
 French Pro Championship draws

External links
British Pro Championships Wembley at Grand Slam Tennis Archive

Carpet court tennis tournaments
Sport in the London Borough of Brent
Tennis tournaments in England
Professional tennis tournaments before the Open Era
Wembley Championships